The orange swift or orange moth (Triodia sylvina) is a moth belonging to the family Hepialidae. The species was first described by Carl Linnaeus in 1761 and was previously placed in the genus Hepialus. It is distributed throughout Europe.

Description
This species has a wingspan of 32–48 mm. The male has rich orange forewings with two white bars forming a "V" shape. The hindwings are dark brown. The female is similar but generally larger and less brightly coloured. It flies at night from June to September and is attracted to light. They do not have a proboscis so will not be found at flowers feeding. The globular, shiny black eggs are broadcast by the female as she hovers over the food plant. 

Larva
When they hatch the larvae find their foodplant, bore into the root and are 25 to 30 mm long when fully fed. They have an orange-brown head and a shiny white body with brownish-orange dorsal plates on the thoracic segments; spiracles are black. They can feed for two years from September to July on the roots of various plants including bracken (Pteridium species), dandelion (Taraxacum species), docks (Rumex species), hop (Humulus lupulus) and viper's bugloss (Echium vulgare).

Pupa
The larvae pupate in silken cocoons near the surface of the soil; pupa are elongated with hooked bristles on the abdominal segments. They leave the cocoon, prior to the emergence of the imago.

Distribution
Found throughout northern, central and south-eastern Europe to the Middle East.

Etymology
Originally placed in the genus Hepialus – from the Greek; hēpialos – means a fever, as in 'the fitful, alternating flight' of the moth. It has since been allocated to the genus Triodia. The specific name sylvina – from silvanus – belonging to a wood, referring to the moths habitat; although it can be found in other habitats.

Gallery

Notes
  The flight season refers to the British Isles. This may vary in other parts of the range.

References

External links

 Lepiforum e.V.

Hepialidae
Moths described in 1761
Moths of Asia
Moths of Europe
Taxa named by Carl Linnaeus